Genoa salami is a variety of salami commonly believed to have originated in the area of Genoa, Italy. It is normally made from pork, but may also contain veal. It is seasoned with garlic, salt, black and white peppercorns, and red or white wine. Like many Italian sausages, it has a characteristic fermented flavor.

The original Genoese name for this kind of sausage is the salame (di) Sant'Olcese, which is a prodotto agroalimentare tradizionale (traditional agricultural food product), and originates in the hilly interior of Genoa's hinterland where pigs are traditionally easily maintained on acorns, chestnuts, and hazelnuts of the local Mediterranean woodlands. Being pressed between the sea, hills and the mountains, Genoa traditionally had no plains on which to raise cattle, and so traditional Genoese cuisine emphasizes pork.

The salami called "di Sant'Olcese" was produced for the first time in Orero, today part of the municipality of Serra Riccò, but which until 1877 was part of the municipality of Sant'Olcese. Industrial production and commercial success in the Genoese area certainly began before the beginning of the 19th century.

See also

 List of dried foods

External links

References 

Lunch meat
Italian sausages
Fermented sausages